The Green Party of Virginia (GPVA) is a state-level political party in Virginia founded in 1993. It is the state affiliate of the Green Party of the United States.

GPVA runs candidates on an ecology platform. The party had its first electoral victory in 1997.

Campaigns
The Green Party of Virginia consistently elects Directors to Soil & Water Conservation Districts and often runs candidates for various local positions and for the state legislature.

The party earned its first electoral victories in November 1997 when Phil Welch was elected to the Buena Vista Soil & Water Conservation District board  and Stephanie Porras was elected to the Lexington Soil & Conservation District Board. Since that time, several other GPVA members have run for office in both partisan and non-partisan races, with notable victories at the town council and SWCD level.

In 2015, Jeff Staples ran for Virginia House of Delegates in the 81st District against Republican Barry Knight and received a total of 30.3% of the vote.

In 2016, Montigue Magruder and Rebecca Keel ran in the Richmond citywide elections and gathered nearly 12% of the votes in their respective districts. Kristen Lawson won the seat to represent Richmond's 4th district with 4,762 votes, 36.9% of the total.

Presidential elections

Officeholders

Current
Ira Richards, Lord Fairfax Soil & Water Conservation District Board of Directors
Thomas Adams, Skyline Soil & Water Conservation District Board of Directors

Former
List incomplete

Kathleen Harrigan, Fredericksburg Soil & Water Conservation District Board of Directors
Daniel Metraux, Staunton Soil & Water Conservation District Board of Directors
Chris Simmons, Loudoun Soil & Water Conservation District Board of Directors
Buck Richards, Warren County Soil & Water Conservation District Board of Directors
Giannina Franz, Fredericksburg Soil and Water Conservation District Board of Directors
Wendy Hageman Smith, Appomattox County School Board
Kristen Larson, Richmond City Council District 4

References

External links
 Green Party of Virginia
 Green Party of the United States

Political parties in Virginia
Virginia
1993 establishments in Virginia
State and local socialist parties in the United States